Blank Face LP is the fourth studio album by American rapper Schoolboy Q. It was released on July 8, 2016, through Top Dawg Entertainment and distributed by Interscope Records. The album serves as his second release under a major record label to music retailers, following 2014's Oxymoron. The album features guest appearances from several prominent artists, such as Kanye West, Jadakiss, E-40, Tha Dogg Pound, Miguel and Anderson .Paak, among others.

The production was handled by various high-profile record producers, including Swizz Beatz, Metro Boomin and Southside, as well as frequent collaborators Nez & Rio, The Alchemist, DJ Dahi and members of TDE in-house production team, Digi+Phonics. Blank Face LP was preceded by a series of short films, which also served as respective corresponding music videos. To further promote the album Schoolboy Q embarked on a concert tour called the Groovy Tony Pit Stops. The album was supported by three singles: "Groovy Tony", "That Part" and "Overtime".

Blank Face LP received widespread acclaim from critics and debuted at number two on the US Billboard 200. It also debuted at number one on the US Top R&B/Hip-Hop Albums. The album received a Grammy nomination for Best Rap Album, while "That Part" received the nomination for Best Rap Performance.

Background
In March 2012, Schoolboy Q signed a recording contract with major record label, Interscope Records. After releasing his Interscope debut, Oxymoron, Schoolboy Q began working on his second album for Interscope. On February 24, 2016, Top Dawg Entertainment (TDE) founder, Anthony "Top Dawg" Tiffith, announced that Schoolboy Q would soon be releasing the follow-up to Oxymoron. On June 14, 2016, Schoolboy Q revealed his second major-label album would be titled Blank Face LP.

Recording and production
TDE's in-house producer Tae Beast of Digi+Phonics, contributed the production on the album's first single, "Groovy Tony". Willie B and Sounwave, both of whom also form Digi+Phonics, provided production on the album as well. GOOD Music founder Kanye West contributed a verse and handled the production on the second single, "That Part", alongside Cardo, Yung Exclusive and Cubeatz. On April 28, 2016, Schoolboy Q announced that the album had been completed, and turned in for mixing. On June 24, 2016, the album's production credits were revealed to include Nez & Rio, Swizz Beatz, The Alchemist, Tyler, the Creator and DJ Dahi, among others.

As of June 2016, listening session for the album, Schoolboy Q revealed Interscope Records lobbied to have R&B singers Miguel and Justine Skye, featured on "Overtime", in hopes of recreating the success of his 2014 top 40 hit single, the BJ the Chicago Kid-assisted "Studio". Although Schoolboy Q was against the idea at first, he ultimately agreed with the label. When the album's production credits were revealed, it was rumored that Kendrick Lamar landed production placement on the song "Overtime". In an interview with New York City radio station Hot 97, Schoolboy Q addressed the hearsay: "That's what everybody's saying. I wasn't there to see him produce it but I remember seeing Cardo produce it. I mean I think Kendrick got some background vocals. He's done a lot of background vocals for me."

In an interview with Rolling Stone, Schoolboy Q revealed that his initial recording sessions for Blank Face LP resulted in "depressed rap." He stated that nothing from those sessions made it on to the album. On June 12, 2016, following the album's release, Schoolboy Q took to Twitter to answer certain questions from fans. One of which related to the absence of his frequent collaborator ASAP Rocky, with whom he has recorded several songs, such as "Brand New Guy", "Hands on the Wheel", "Electric Body" and "Califonication". Schoolboy Q revealed Rocky was originally on the album, however the song's producer, Pharrell Williams, had given the instrumental to another artist. Schoolboy Q also revealed he freestyled all the lyrics to "John Muir".

Release and promotion
On June 14, 2016, Schoolboy Q revealed that his second major-label album would be titled Blank Face LP, while also unveiling what was thought to be the album's cover art. The artwork makes use of the notorious Crying Jordan meme, with his face blurred out. On June 16, Schoolboy Q released what was thought to be the cover art for the deluxe edition of the album, which features 2016 US presidential candidate Donald Trump, with his face blurred out as well. However, a few days later, in an interview with TMZ, Schoolboy Q revealed that he was "trolling" his fans and later unveiled the official album cover.

On June 18, 2016, Schoolboy Q released a trailer, which previewed a new song, in promotion for the album. On June 21, Schoolboy Q released the second trailer as promotion for the short film, which was co-directed by Kendrick Lamar and the Lil Homies. On June 23, Schoolboy Q revealed the album's track listing. On June 24, Schoolboy Q released the short film, titled By Any Means (which became the eighth track on the album). The nine-minute short film presents a loose day-in-the-life look at Schoolboy Q's South Central neighborhood.

On June 27, 2016, Schoolboy Q announced the Groovy Tony Pit Stops, a 12 show concert tour in support for the album. The tour began in San Francisco on July 9, and concluded on July 17, in Houston. On June 29, Schoolboy Q held a listening session for the album in New York City, which was hosted by Hot 97 radio personality, Peter Rosenberg. On June 30, Schoolboy Q released Tookie Knows II, the continuation of his short film By Any Means. In June 2016, Schoolboy Q appeared on The Late Show with Stephen Colbert, where he performed a live rendition of "Groovy Tony" and "That Part". On July 11, Schoolboy Q released the third installment to his mini-film series, titled Black Thoughts (Pt. 3).

Singles
The first official single from the album, titled "Groovy Tony", was released on April 5, 2016. The song garnered attention after TDE's founder Anthony "Top Dawg" Tiffith, helped promote the track by posting a pre-release snippet of the song on Instagram, as well as teasing the idea of unveiling a new song after his flight. "Groovy Tony" was released hours later via digital distribution, alongside a music video, which was directed by Jack Begert and the Little Homies.

On May 13, 2016, Interscope label services began promoting a song, titled "That Part" via urban and rhythmic radio formats in North America, as the album's second single. The song features a guest appearance from American rapper and record producer Kanye West, while the production was handled by Cardo, Yung Exclusive and Cubeatz. "That Part" debuted at number 40 on the US Billboard Hot 100. The music video for "That Part" (directed by Colin Tilley) was released on June 2, 2016. "That Part" was later remixed, featuring new verses from Schoolboy Q's Black Hippy cohorts Jay Rock, Kendrick Lamar and Ab-Soul, which was released on July 8.

"Overtime" was sent to urban and rhythmic radio formats in North America, on September 12, 2016, as the album's third single. The official music video for "Overtime" was also released on September 12.

Critical reception

Blank Face LP was met with widespread critical acclaim. At Metacritic, which assigns a normalized rating out of 100 to reviews from mainstream publications, the album received an average score of 81, based on 18 reviews. Aggregator AnyDecentMusic? gave it 7.4 out of 10, based on their assessment of the critical consensus.

David Jeffries of AllMusic said, "This sprawling, cumbersome, and often psychedelic effort feels like a glorious clearing house for the diverse and deep rapper, offering giant, cinematic, and challenging efforts." Michael Madden of Consequence said, "It's hard and sinister like a gangster rap album, but it's also sprawling and even psychedelic at times. Nothing else sounds like it, and that's a joy to behold." Eric Renner Brown of Entertainment Weekly said, "At 72 minutes, Blank Face does sometimes sag under its own ambition. ... But with an impressive range of sonic and lyrical styles and numerous highlights, Blank Face LP stands as one of 2016's most engaging rap projects." Writing for Exclaim! A. Harmony praised the album's "heterogeneous collection of styles". Jonah Bromwich of Pitchfork said, "Blank Face turns away from the ambitious fusion of To Pimp a Butterfly, instead doubling down on a smoked-out atmosphere that points the listener's focus toward rapping. That puts the onus on Q to hold attention for the duration of the record's hour-plus running time, and he does so." Keith Harris of Rolling Stone, praised the production and guest appearances, writing: "Digi+Phonics, Black Hippy's go-to production crew, handle most of the beats, which are plush with sumptuous, weed-hazy pleasures but steeped in a dank, justifiable paranoia. Nearly every element of the sound – the mean breakbeat from an old Christine McVie tune that Tae Beast loops beneath lead single "Groovy Tony", R&B visionary Anderson .Paak sweetening the mood without lightening it, guest rhymes from Kanye and Jadakiss and Vince Staples – adds an ominous undertone."

Kris Ex of Spin said, "It's not easy to homogenize the opposing forces at play, but everything here feels like a genuine rumble through a mind scarred and inebriated by the reality of gang life and chasing the American dream while the room spins." Chris Gibbons of XXL, concluded with: "Blank Face LP isn't Schoolboy Q's first great album, but it's the first one where he lives up to his utmost potential. He can be smooth, he can be hard as nails, but whatever he is, the MC does it with greatness. Q can talk about his violent, drug-dealing past and almost celebrate it in one moment and decry the ever-present dangers of hood life in the next. Blank Face is the album an artist like Schoolboy Q was born to make." In a mixed review, Sam C. Mac of Slant Magazine said, "Blank Face LP is ultimately an unfocused album, one caught between reportage and repugnant opportunism." In another mixed review, Jessica Ankomah of Now said, "Q might appear masked on the album cover, but his explicit tales of hardship, prosperity and loss hide nothing."

Rankings

Industry awards

Retrospective
In a 2019 interview with Vulture, Schoolboy Q expressed his dissatisfaction with the content of Blank Face LP, stating: "Some shit just be too introspective. Some shit be too turnt up. I want balance in my music. I'm not a guy that's just about to give you one sound. That's so boring and lame to me. That's my biggest regret with Blank Face. Besides a couple songs, I just made the whole album pretty dark. I regret that so much. Why did I do that?"

Commercial performance
Blank Face LP debuted at number two on the US Billboard 200, with 74,000 album-equivalent units with 52,000 copies coming from pure album sales in its first week. It was the highest selling album in its debut week. Blank Face LP is Schoolboy Q's second top five album on the Billboard 200, and follows his number one debuting Oxymoron effort in 2014 which sold 139,000 copies in its first week. In its second week, the album dropped to number 10 on the Billboard 200, earning 28,000 album-equivalent units that week. On June 8, 2018, the album was certified gold by Recording Industry Association of America (RIAA) for combined sales and album-equivalent units of over 500,000 units in the United States.

Track listing

Notes
  signifies an additional producer
  signifies a vocal producer
 All songs are stylized with the capital letter "H" if they contain that letter in the title. For example, "That Part" is stylized as "THat Part".
 "Torch" features background vocals by Anderson .Paak
 "Lord Have Mercy" features background vocals by Swizz Beatz
 "Groovy Tony / Eddie Kane" features background vocals by Dem Jointz and additional vocals by Candice Pillay
 "By Any Means" features background vocals by Kendrick Lamar, and additional vocals by Candice Pillay and Terrace Martin
 "Dope Dealer" features additional vocals by Smacc
 "John Muir" features additional vocals by Sam Dew
 "Big Body" features additional vocals by Candice Pillay
 "Str8 Ballin'" features background vocals by Jesse Rankins
 "Black Thoughts" features intro vocals by Trayvon Ray Cail and additional vocals by Kendrick Lamar
 "Overtime" features additional vocals by Kendrick Lamar

Sample credits
 "Lord Have Mercy" contains elements of "Cristo Redentor", as performed by Donald Byrd and written by Duke Pearson.
 "Groovy Tony / Eddie Kane" contains re-spoken dialogue from the film The Five Heartbeats, written by Robert Townsend.
 "Dope Dealer" contains a sample of "Masterpiece", as performed by Grover Washington Jr. and written by Norman Whitfield; as well as a sample of "Playa Hataz", as performed by Three 6 Mafia and written by Paul Beauregard, Jordan Houston and Patrick Houston.
 "John Muir" contains a sample of "Silently", as performed by The Delfonics and Adrian Younge, and written by William Hart, Dave Henderson, Tom Simon and Adrian Younge.
 "Str8 Ballin'" contains an interpolation of "Picture Me Rollin'", written by Robert Bell, Ronald Bell, George Brown, Vince Edwards, Tyruss Himes, Johnny Jackson, Robert Mickens, Otha Nash, Tupac Shakur, Claydes Smith, Dennis Thomas and Richard Westfield; as well as a sample of "Movin' on Up", as performed by Ja'net Dubois and written by Jeff Barry and Ja'net Dubois.
 "Black Thoughts" contains a sample of "Drop", as performed by Soft Machine and written by Mike Ratledge; as well as a sample of "Good Old Music", as performed by Funkadelic and written by George Clinton.

Personnel
Credits for Blank Face LP adapted from AllMusic.

 The Alchemist – producer
 Derek "MixedByAli" Ali – mixing
 Willie B – producer
 Tae Beast – producer
 Mike Bozzi – mastering
 Trayvon Ray Cail – vocals
 Cardo – producer
 Cubeatz – producer
 Quentin Curtat – photography
 Dem Jointz – producer, background vocals
 Sam Dew – vocals
 DJ Dahi – producer
 Tha Dogg Pound – featured artist
 Larrance Dopson – producer
 E-40 – featured artist
 Yung Exclusive – producer
 Frank Dukes – producer
 Dave Free – associate producer, creative director
 Noah Goldstein – engineer
 Rob Gueringer – guitar
 Sam Hook – vocal producer
 James Hunt – engineer
 Jadakiss – featured artist
 Tom Khare – engineer
 Kendrick Lamar – vocals, background vocals
 Migui Maloles – engineer
 Terrace Martin – bass, horn, keyboards, saxophone, vocals, vocoder
 Metro Boomin – producer
 Miguel – featured artist
 Jaris Moses – bass, guitar
 Nez & Rio – producer
 Anderson .Paak – featured artist, background vocals
 Candice Pillay – featured artist, vocals
 Jason Pounds – producer
 Jesse Rankins – background vocals
 Tony Russell – producer
 Matt Schaeffer – mixing assistant
 Schoolboy Q – creative director, primary artist
 Vlad Sepetov – creative director
 Lance Skiiiwalker – featured artist
 Justine Skye – featured artist
 Sounwave – additional production, drums, keyboards, piano, producer
 Southside – producer
 Vince Staples – featured artist
 William Sullivan – assistant engineer
 Swizz Beatz – producer, background vocals
 SZA – featured artist
 TF – featured artist
 Anthony "Top Dawg" Tiffith – executive producer
 Traffic – featured artist
 Tyler, the Creator – producer
 Kanye West – featured artist
 Marlon Williams – guitar

Charts

Weekly charts

Year-end charts

Certifications

References

2016 albums
Schoolboy Q albums
Top Dawg Entertainment albums
Interscope Records albums
Albums produced by the Alchemist (musician)
Albums produced by Cardo
Albums produced by DJ Dahi
Albums produced by Frank Dukes
Albums produced by Metro Boomin
Albums produced by Southside (record producer)
Albums produced by Swizz Beatz
Albums produced by Tyler, the Creator
Albums produced by Cubeatz
Albums produced by Sounwave
Albums produced by Tae Beast
Albums produced by Willie B